B. M. U. D. Basnayake was a Sri Lankan civil servant. He was the Defence Secretary, prior to which he served as Permanent Secretary to the Ministry of Environment and Renewable Energy.

References

Alumni of Richmond College, Galle
Alumni of the University of Ceylon (Peradeniya)
Alumni of the University of Sri Jayewardenepura
Living people
Permanent secretaries of Sri Lanka
Place of birth missing (living people)
Sinhalese civil servants
Year of birth missing (living people)